The Aird Baronetcy, of Hyde Park Terrace in Paddington in the County of London, is a title in the Baronetage of the United Kingdom. It was created on 5 March 1901 for the civil engineering contractor and Conservative politician John Aird.

The present Baronet is a co-heir to the barony of Willoughby de Eresby

Aird baronets, of Hyde Park Terrace (1901)
Sir John Aird, 1st Baronet (1833–1911)
Sir John Aird, 2nd Baronet (1861–1934)
Sir John Renton Aird, 3rd Baronet (1898–1973)
Sir (George) John Aird, 4th Baronet (born 1940)

The heir apparent is the present holder's son James John Aird (born 1978).

References

Kidd, Charles, Williamson, David (editors). Debrett's Peerage and Baronetage (1990 edition). New York: St Martin's Press, 1990.

Baronetcies in the Baronetage of the United Kingdom